Dawn Steele (born 11 December 1975) is a Scottish actress best known for her portrayals of the characters Alexandra “Lexie” MacDonald from the BBC drama Monarch of the Glen, Alice Trevanion in the ITV drama series Wild at Heart and Dr. Annie Jandhu/Murdoch in BBC Soap Opera River City. Steele played Ange Godard in BBC's Holby City until it ended in March 2022.

Career
Dawn Steele was born in Glasgow and moved to Milton of Campsie in 1982, attended Kilsyth Academy from around 1987–1993 and studied at the Royal Scottish Academy of Music and Drama (RSAMD) in Glasgow from 1994 to 1998, supporting her early career as a waitress in the Rogano Restaurant. She graduated with first class honours in July 1998, and was the winner of the silver medal at the RSAMD in 1998.

Her most notable role was as Alexandra "Lexie" MacDonald in seasons one through six in the BBC drama Monarch of the Glen, between 1999 and 2004. In January 2005, she appeared as new character Justine McManus in the second season of the BBC’s paranormal drama show Sea of Souls with Iain Robertson and Bill Paterson. Before she teamed up with Iain Robertson to work on Sea of Souls they had previously worked together on The Slab Boys and The Debt Collector. Shortly after, she appeared as a student on the BBC reality show Fame Academy in a second all-celebrity series in aid of the charity Comic Relief does Fame Academy.

In January 2006, Steele returned in the third season of Sea of Souls. In April 2007 she played Shazza in Simon Farquhar's powerful Aberdonian drama Rainbow Kiss at the Royal Court Theatre in London's West End. Reviews praised her performance as a promiscuous beautician who becomes the object of a lethal obsession. In 2002 Steele was voted the Most Eligible Woman in Scotland and followed this up in 2003 when she was voted the second most eligible woman in Scotland by readers of a Sunday newspaper.

Steele starred in a one-off BBC One comedy, Magnolia, which aired on 22 September 2006. In November 2007 she made her pantomime debut as the Wicked Witch Carrion in Sleeping Beauty at the King's Theatre, Glasgow. In 2009 she returned to TV screens in the fourth season of ITV's Wild at Heart, playing a new character, Alice Collins, as the replacement for Amanda Holden who left the show after the third season.

In the summer of 2009, she guest presented STV's daily lifestyle show The Hour for a week, alongside main anchor Stephen Jardine.

In 2010, she returned once more as Alice for a 10-episode run in the fifth season of the popular show Wild at Heart. She returned again for another 10-episode run in the sixth season of Wild at Heart but as Alice Trevanion; Alice and Danny got engaged at the end of season five. There will be no eighth season, but Steele returned for the last ever episode, a two-hour special, which was shown on 30 December 2012. 

In 2011, Agatha Christie Theatre Company's national tour of the 1958 play Verdict starred Steele playing the part of Lisa Koletzky. In May 2012 she returned to the stage for the UK tour of Noël Coward's Volcano as Melissa Littleton and which transferred to the West End in August.

Steele appeared in the BBC Crime Drama Case Histories which aired in June 2013, playing the part of Charlotte McGill.

In 2014 she appeared in the stage show of the Peter James novel The Perfect Murder.

In October 2015 Steele joined the cast of the BBC1 Scotland Drama River City playing Dr. Annie Jandhu. Steele quit River City in 2018 stating that the commute from her home in Kent had become too much.

On 19 September 2018, it was announced that Steele had joined the cast of BBC medical drama Holby City in the role of consultant general surgeon Ange Godard. She made her first appearance in the show's twenty-first series, broadcast in January 2019.

Education
1994–1998 Royal Scottish Academy of Music and Drama, Glasgow, BA Dramatic Studies (Hons)
1998 – Graduated First Class Honours
1998 – Winner of Silver Medal RSAMD

Filmography

Theatrical credits

References

External links
 

1975 births
Living people
Actresses from Glasgow
Alumni of the Royal Conservatoire of Scotland
Scottish film actresses
Scottish soap opera actresses
Scottish stage actresses
Scottish television actresses
People from Milton of Campsie